Jean Morin may refer to:

Jean Morin (theologian) (1591–1659), French theologian and biblical scholar
Jean Morin (artist) (c. 1595 - 1650), French painter, etcher and engraver
Jean Morin (bobsleigh) (1901–?), French Olympic bobsledder 
Jean Morin (ice hockey) (born 1963), Canadian National Hockey League linesman

See also
 Jean-Baptiste Morin (disambiguation)
 Jean-Louis Morin  (disambiguation)